Óscar Fernández González, simply known as Óscar (born 16 May 1995), is a Spanish footballer who plays for Racing Rioja. Mainly a right winger, he can also play as a forward.

Football career
Born in Renedo de Piélagos, Cantabria, Óscar graduated from local CA Perines. On 8 July 2014 he moved to Racing de Santander, being initially assigned to the reserves in the Tercera División.

Late in the month, Óscar was called up by manager Paco Fernández to make the pre-season with the main squad. On 24 August 2014 he played his first match as a professional, replacing Bernardo in the 85th minute of a 0–1 away loss against Girona FC in the Segunda División.

Óscar only featured in one more match for the first team during the season, a 1–2 home loss against CD Leganés on 21 February 2015; his side subsequently suffered relegation. He was definitely promoted to the main squad the following July, and scored a brace in a 2–0 Segunda División B home win against Cultural y Deportiva Leonesa on 20 March 2016.

On 17 July 2018, free agent Óscar signed a two-year deal with AD Alcorcón, but was immediately loaned to CF Fuenlabrada for one year. The following 9 January, he moved to fellow third division side CD Castellón, on loan until June.

On 25 July 2019, Fernández signed for third division side Barakaldo CF after terminating his contract with the Alfareros. After seven months at CD Don Benito from January to July 2020, Fernández moved to Pontevedra CF on a deal until June 2021.

References

External links

1995 births
Living people
Spanish footballers
Footballers from Cantabria
Association football wingers
Association football forwards
Segunda División players
Segunda División B players
Tercera División players
Rayo Cantabria players
Racing de Santander players
AD Alcorcón footballers
CF Fuenlabrada footballers
CD Castellón footballers
Barakaldo CF footballers
CD Don Benito players
Pontevedra CF footballers
Racing Rioja CF players